West Virginia Route 331 (WV 331) is an east–west state highway located entirely in Jackson County, West Virginia. The western terminus of the route is at West Virginia Route 2 and West Virginia Route 62 in Mount Alto. The eastern terminus is at WV 62 near Cottageville.

WV 331 is a former alignment of U.S. Route 33, which was later moved to follow all of present WV 62 between Mason and Ripley.

Major intersections

References

331
Transportation in Jackson County, West Virginia